Journey is an album by McCoy Tyner's Big Band released on the Birdology label in 1993. It was recorded in May 1993 and features performances by Tyner's Big Band, which included trombonists Steve Turre and Frank Lacy, alto saxophonist Joe Ford, tenor saxophonist Billy Harper, bassist  Avery Sharpe and drummer Aaron Scott. Dianne Reeves sings Sammy Cahn’s lyrics on Tyner’s classic composition “You Taught My Heart to Sing”.

Reception

The Allmusic review by Ron Wynn states that "While this isn't among Tyner's greatest recordings, it's still a rigorous, often exciting big-band date".

Track listing
 "Samba Dei Ber" (Rangelov) - 4:20
 "Juanita" (Turre)  11:00
 "Choices" (Mackrel) - 11:17
 "You Taught My Heart to Sing" (Cahn, Tyner) - 6:17
 "Peresina" - 11:15
 "Blues on the Corner" - 9:29
 "January in Brasil" (Sharpe) - 6:04
All compositions by McCoy Tyner except as indicated
Recorded in NYC, November 19 & 20, 1991

Personnel
 McCoy Tyner –  piano, arranger
 Eddie Henderson –  trumpet
 Earl Gardner –  trumpet
 Virgil Jones –  trumpet
 Frank Lacy –  trombone
 Slide Hampton; trombone (track 1)
 Steve Turre –  trombone, arranger
 John Clark –  French horn
 Tony Underwood –  tuba
 Joe Ford –  alto saxophone
 Doug Harris –  alto saxophone, flute
 Billy Harper –  tenor saxophone
 John Stubblefield –  tenor saxophone
 Ronnie Cuber –  baritone saxophone (track 1)
 Avery Sharpe –  double bass
 Aaron Scott –  drums
 Jerry Gonzalez –  percussion, trumpet
 Valtinho Anastacio –  percussion (track 1)
 Dianne Reeves –  vocals (track 4)

References

McCoy Tyner albums
1993 albums
Verve Records albums